Adulai Sambu is an English professional footballer who plays as a midfielder for Cirencester Town on loan from  club Cheltenham Town.

Playing career
Sambu made his first-team debut for Cheltenham Town on 30 August 2022, coming on as an 81st-minute substitute for Charlie Brown in a 2–1 win away at Milton Keynes Dons.

Sambu then went on to make his first team full debut for Cheltenham Town on 18 October 2022, His strong performance against the Hammers West ham United encouraged fans to vote for him as their Man of the match Which he comfortably won.

In March 2023, Sambu joined Cirencester Town on a work-experience loan until the end of the season.

Statistics

References

2004 births
Living people
English footballers
Association football midfielders
Cheltenham Town F.C. players
Cirencester Town F.C. players
English Football League players